Charles Stewart Barrett (5 October 1901 – 15 January 1982) was an Irish water polo player. He competed in the men's tournament at the 1924 Summer Olympics.

Barrett played for the Clontarf Waterpolo Club.

References

External links
 

1901 births
1982 deaths
Irish male water polo players
Olympic water polo players of Ireland
Water polo players at the 1924 Summer Olympics
Place of birth missing